My Heart's in the Highlands is a one act play by Armenian-American dramatist and author William Saroyan, adapted from his short story, "The Man with the Heart in the Highlands". Saroyan's first play, it is a comedy about a young boy and his Armenian family. It was produced on Broadway at the Guild Theatre.

Adaptations

Chamber opera
The play was adapted into a chamber opera by U.S. composer Jack Beeson in 1969 and had its world debut on U.S. network National Educational Television, the predecessor of the U.S. Public Broadcasting Service, March 17, 1970. The 90-minute broadcast, directed by pioneering operatic TV director Kirk Browning, was part of the NET Opera Theater series, which aired on NET and then on PBS. The TV broadcast also included, for the first time, simulcast high-fidelity stereo audio. “NET organized links with FM stations throughout the country to broadcast the stereo soundtrack of My Heart’s in the Highlands simultaneously with the telecast,” writes Brian G. Rose, professor of communication and media studies at New York’s Fordham University. “By turning off the volume of their televisions and turning on their stereos, home viewers could now have the chance to hear opera with extraordinary fidelity and range. The technique would become an important adjunct of non-commercial television’s music programming from that point onward.”

References

1939 plays
Plays by William Saroyan
Plays set in the United States
American plays adapted into films
One-act plays
Plays adapted into operas
Plays based on short fiction